A blackwater river is a type of river with a slow-moving channel flowing through forested swamps or wetlands. As vegetation decays, tannins leach into the water, making a transparent, acidic water that is darkly stained, resembling black tea. Most major blackwater rivers are in the Amazon Basin and the Southern United States. The term is used in fluvial studies, geology, geography, ecology, and biology.  Not all dark rivers are blackwater in that technical sense. Some rivers in temperate regions, which drain or flow through areas of dark black loam, are simply black due to the color of the soil; these rivers are black mud rivers. There are also black mud estuaries.

Blackwater rivers are lower in nutrients than whitewater rivers and have ionic concentrations higher than rainwater. The unique conditions lead to flora and fauna that differ from both whitewater and clearwater rivers. Although many Amazonian rivers fall clearly into one of these categories, others show a mix of characteristics and may vary depending on season and flood levels.

Comparison between white and black waters

Black and white waters differ significantly in their ionic composition, as shown in Table 1.  Black waters are more acidic, resulting in an aluminum concentration greater than that of the more neutral white waters.  The major difference is the concentrations of sodium, magnesium, calcium, and potassium; these are very low in black waters.  This has ecological implications. Some animals need more calcium than is available in blackwaters, so for example, snails, which need much calcium to build shells, are not abundant in blackwaters. The lack of dissolved ions in black waters results in a low conductivity, similar to that of rainwater.

Black and white waters differ in their planktonic fauna and flora. Tables 2 and 3 compare the number of planktonic animals caught in black and white water localities only a few meters apart. The black water was not as extreme an example as the Rio Negro system. However, it can be seen that the black water held greater numbers of rotifers but fewer crustaceans and mites. These crustaceans are important foods for larval fish. The zones where the two waters mix are attractive to ostracods and young fish. These mixing zones tend to have many animals.

Comparison between clear and black waters
Blackwater rivers resemble clearwater rivers in having a low conductivity and relatively low levels of dissolved solids, but clearwater rivers have water that often only is somewhat acidic (typical pH ~6.5) and very clear with a greenish color. The main Amazonian clearwater rivers have their source in the Brazilian Plateau (such as Tapajós, Tocantins, Xingu and some right tributaries of the Madeira), but some originate in the Guiana Shield (such as Nhamundá, Paru, and Araguari).

Blackwater rivers of the world

Amazonia
Apaporis River: a tributary of the Japurá River
Arapiuns River: a tributary of the Tapajós River
Coari River
Mazaruni River
Mirití-Paraná River
Piorini River
Potaro River: a tributary of the Mazaruni River
Rio Negro: The largest blackwater river in the world; one of the largest Amazonian tributaries.
Tahuayo River
Tefé River
Uatumã River
Urubu River
Vaupés River

Orinoco basin
 Morichal Largo River
 Atabapo River: from the Guiana highlands of Venezuela west into the Orinoco
 Caroní River: from the Guiana Highlands of Venezuela north into the Orinoco.
 Caura River: from the Guiana Highlands of Venezuela north into the Orinoco
 Inírida River: from Colombia northeast into the Guaviare River which flows into the Orinoco
 Ventuari River: from eastern Venezuela southwest into the Orinoco
 Vichada River: from Colombia east into the Orinoco
 Tomo River: from Colombia east into the Orinoco
 Tuparro River: from Colombia east into the Orinoco

Southern United States

Ashepoo River: along with the Edisto and the Combahee Rivers in South Carolina makes up the ACE Basin National Wildlife Refuge.
Big Cypress, Black Cypress, and Little Cypress and the small rivers in the watershed of Caddo Lake in Texas and Louisiana
Blackwater River: a tributary of the Chowan River in Virginia
Blackwater River: a major river in the western Florida panhandle
Blackwater River, West Virginia: Located in the Blackwater Canyon in Tucker County. Blackwater Falls, a five-story waterfall, is located along this river with rapids ranging from ClassIII-V+.
Black River: a tributary of the Pee Dee River in North and South Carolina
Cape Fear River, North Carolina: flows into the Atlantic Ocean.
Cashie River, North Carolina: flows into Albemarle Sound.
Caloosahatchee River, Florida: flows west from Lake Okeechobee to the Gulf of Mexico.
Chowan River, North Carolina: flows into Albemarle Sound.
Edisto River, South Carolina: flows into the Atlantic Ocean.
Econlockhatchee River, a tributary of the St. Johns River in Central Florida.
Forked Deer River: located in West Tennessee
Four Hole Swamp, a tributary of the Edisto River in South Carolina.
Little Manatee River, Florida: flows into Tampa Bay.
Great Coharie Creek, North Carolina: flows into the Black River.
Little Pee Dee River, South Carolina: flows into the Pee Dee River.
Lynches River, South Carolina:  flows into the Pee Dee River.
Lumber/Drowning Creek: located in North and South Carolina. Part of Lumber River State Park
Myakka River: 66 mile-long river with its headwaters in Manatee County, Florida. The Myakka River discharges into Charlotte Harbor.
Obion River: located in Northwest Tennessee
Ochlockonee River: a river in northern Florida
Ogeechee River: a 245-mile river in eastern Georgia that passes to the south of the city of Savannah and enters the Atlantic Ocean at Ossabaw Sound.
Ohoopee River: a 119-mile-long (192 km) river in east-central Georgia. It is a tributary of the Altamaha River, which flows to the Atlantic Ocean.
Pasquotank River: a river in Northeastern North Carolina. Located between Camden and Pasquotank counties, the Pasquotank connects directly to the Albemarle Sound and is part of the Intracoastal Waterway via Elizabeth City.
Peace River: located in central Florida, flows into Charlotte Harbor.
Pithlachascotee River: a small river in central Florida
Pocomoke River: a river in southern Delaware and southeastern Maryland on the Delmarva Peninsula. The river is a tributary to the Chesapeake Bay.
Santa Fe River: a river in northern Florida
Satilla River: a river in southeast Georgia that flows through the city of Waycross and empties into the Atlantic Ocean near Cumberland Island.
Scuppernong River: a small river in Washington and Tyrrell Counties in eastern North Carolina at Pettigrew State Park
Sopchoppy River: a river in northern Florida
St. Mary's River (Florida–Georgia): a 130-mile river  located in southeast Georgia and is bordered by the Satilla River Basin to the north and the Suwannee River Basin to the west.
St. Johns River: The largest river in Florida. Flows north through Jacksonville and into the Atlantic. 
St. Sebastian River, Indian River County, Florida.
Suwannee River: a large river in southern Georgia and northern Florida flowing into the Gulf of Mexico
Upper Little River, North Carolina: flows into the Cape Fear River.
Upper Nanticoke River, Delaware and Maryland: flows into the Chesapeake Bay.
Village Creek, a 63 Mile long stream in the Big Thicket region of southeast Texas: flows into the Neches River.
Waccamaw River, North and South Carolina: flows into the Atlantic Ocean.
White Oak River, North Carolina: flows into the Atlantic Ocean.
Wolf River: arises in Northern Mississippi and runs through southwest Tennessee/Memphis into Mississippi River

Northern United States

Black River, New York: a river starting in the western Adirondacks that flows into Lake Ontario.
Black River (Gogebic County), Michigan: a river in the far western Upper Peninsula that flows into Lake Superior. The northern section of the river is listed as a National Wild and Scenic River.
Mullica River and its tributaries from the Pine Barrens, New Jersey, where the dark water is called cedar water
Gooseberry River: a river in northern Minnesota that leaches from peat bogs and pine forests
Ocqueoc River, Michigan: a river in the northern Lower Peninsula that flows in Lake Huron
Tahquamenon River, Michigan: a river in the Upper Peninsula that flows into Lake Superior
Tuckahoe River, New Jersey: a short river in southern New Jersey that flows into Great Egg Harbor

Africa
 Most Congo and Lower Guinean rivers that flow through rainforests are blackwater.
 The Congo basin lakes Mai-Ndombe and Tumba are blackwater.
 The New Calabar and Sombreiro Rivers (both exiting in the Niger River Delta) are blackwater.

Australia
Gordon River, Tasmania: a river rising in the center of the island and flowing westward, emptying into Macquarie Harbour on the West Coast
Pieman River, Tasmania: a river on the West Coast which leaches from rainforests and heathlands
Davey River, Tasmania: a relatively small river in the southwest corner of the island which runs through extensive heathlands, peat bogs and button grass plains
Noosa River, Queensland: a small section of the Noosa River running between Lake Cootharaba and Lake Cooroibah
Searys Creek, Queensland: a small river running from the Great Sandy National Park to Tin Can Bay stained with tea-tree tannin.

Other rivers in Australia may experience infrequent 'blackwater events' associated with flood waters connecting to forested floodplains and these events may be associated with hypoxic waters [low oxygen]. Examples include the Murray River, Edward River, Wakool River and Murrumbidgee River.

Indonesia
 Sabangau River

Images of blackwater rivers

See also

 Bog
 Colored dissolved organic matter

References

Aquatic ecology
Rivers